The Appalachian League League Hall of Fame is an American baseball hall of fame which honors players, managers, and executives of the Appalachian League of Minor League Baseball for their accomplishments and/or contributions to the league in playing or administrative roles. The Hall of Fame inducted its first class of seven in 2019. Through the elections for 2020, a total of 38 people have been inducted.

Table key

Inductees

References

External links

Hall
Minor league baseball museums and halls of fame
Minor league baseball trophies and awards
Awards established in 2019